Trichilia dregeana, commonly known as the forest natal-mahogany, is a tree in the family Meliaceae. These trees are found in forest areas from the Eastern Cape of South Africa to Tropical Africa.

Description
The 7 to 11 leaflets of the large compound leaf have 7 to 12 lateral veins, typically less than the related Natal mahogany. The dehiscent fruit is reddish brown, spherical and about 3 cm in diameter. As with the Natal mahogany, each black seed is almost enveloped by a red aril.

Gallery

References

dregeana
Taxa named by Otto Wilhelm Sonder